Ruz is a 2009 film directed by Gopalen Parthiben Chellapermal.

Synopsis 
A family of mixed heritage sits down to eat. There is the grandmother of Creole origin, the grandfather of Tamil origin, their daughter, her husband of Chinese origin and their granddaughter, who is ten years old. Also present are the son of the elderly couple, his wife of Muslim origin and their son of seven years. The boy turns up all painted in red, stirring up social stereotypes that lead to a conversation concerning the coexistence of this family, ostensibly so proud of their mixed heritage.

External links 

2009 films
Mauritian short films